James Cullen may refer to:
James Cullen (mathematician) (1867–1933), Irish Jesuit, described Cullen numbers
James Cullen (PTAA) (1841–1921), Irish Jesuit, founder of the Pioneer Total Abstinence Association
James P. Cullen (1945–2017), American brigadier general

See also
James Cullen Martin (1928–1999), American chemist
Jim Cullen (1878–1954), Australian rules footballer
Jim Cullen (skier), Canadian para-alpine skier